Molenbeek-Saint-Jean Cemetery is a cemetery belonging to Molenbeek-Saint-Jean in Brussels, Belgium, where the municipality's inhabitants have the right to be buried. It is located at 539, /, in the west of the municipality.

The cemetery was inaugurated on 16 August 1864 to replace the old parish cemetery around the Church of St. John the Baptist, which had become too small, and whose last remains were cleared in 1932. Today, it concentrates a considerable protected heritage, including funeral galleries and a columbarium initially imagined for Laeken Cemetery and built in 1880, as well as several chapels.

Main sights
The cemetery houses fine examples of 19th-century funerary art. Examples include:
 the burial galleries and columbarium from 1880, spurred on by Émile Bockstael, after his earlier initiative at Laeken Cemetery
 the Art Nouveau funerary monument of the family des Cressonnières by Victor Horta (1894)
 the tomb of the Beelaert family with a bronze sculpture by Amédée Hamoir
 the funerary monument of the Jean De Maerschalck family by Ernest Salu

Notable interments

Personalities buried there include:
 Jan Frantz De Mol, composer
 Julien Hanssens (1842–1914), mayor from 1912 to 1914
 Henri Hollevoet (1833–1911), mayor from 1879 to 1911
 Ernest Kindermans (1875–1932), founder of the Kaaitheater
 Eugène Laermans (1864–1940), painter and engraver
 Edmond Machtens (1902–1978), mayor from 1939 to 1978
 Louise Charlotte Massart (1880–1906), dramaturge
 Louis Mettewie (1855–1942), mayor from 1919 to 1938
 Henry Meuwis (1870–1935), painter
 Sander Pierron (1872–1945), writer and art critic
 Jean-Baptiste Piron (1896–1974), military officer, best known for his role in the Free Belgian forces during World War II
 Édouard Van Haelen (1895–1936), swimmer and 1920 Summer Olympics medalist

See also

 List of cemeteries in Belgium
 Brussels Cemetery
 Ixelles Cemetery
 Saint-Josse-ten-Noode Cemetery
 Schaerbeek Cemetery

References

Notes

Bibliography
 
 
 

Cemeteries in Belgium
Buildings and structures in Brussels
Geography of Brussels
Culture in Brussels
Molenbeek-Saint-Jean
Protected heritage sites in Brussels